Sue Samuels (born May 15, 1949) is an American dancer, choreographer, master jazz teacher and performer. She is the founder and artistic director of Jazz Roots Dance Company.

Early career

At the age of 13 Samuels started her dance training in 1962. This began at the Broward Civic Ballet in Florida. She became this company's first soloist. performing here for six years. She studied in New York with Madame Swoboda of the Ballet Russe de Monte Carlo. Samuels developed a multi discipline practice by simultaneously studying jazz dance with JoJo Smith, Frank Hatchett and Michael Shawn, tap with Judy Bassing and Kathy Burke, and voice with William Daniel Grey and Susan Edwards.

Career

Samuels is the founder and artistic director of Jazz Roots Dance Company, which was formed in 2009 to preserve and promote the classic jazz dance style. She considers choreography the foundation of her practice and almost all of the Jazz Roots Dance Company repertory is arranged by her. While preserving her own works she also maintains performance of significant pieces by choreographers including Luigi, Matt Maddox, Phil Black, Bob Fosse, Jack Cole, Ron Lewis among others. The company’s First Season and Gala at the Peridance Capezio Center was produced by Samuels and Jazz Roots Dance embarked on a tour to Los Angeles.

Samuels co-founded JoJo’s Dance Factory in New York City, which she co-owned with JoJo Smith for ten years. This establishment evolved into Broadway Dance Center. She established the children's jazz program at Fort Lauderdale Ballet in Florida where she was also director of the Jazz Department, simultaneously running her own dance teaching program in Boca Raton. for five years.

She has choreographed works for dance companies in Japan, Finland, and Brazil.

In 2016 a multimedia stage show called Jazz on the West Side which used new interpretations of songs from West Side Story featured choreography by Sue Samuels.

Teaching

Having taught dance since the 80s, Samuels is well established in the New York performing arts community where she is viewed as having "legendary status".  Dance Teacher magazine wrote, "Samuels has been a jazz staple on the New York dance scene—teaching, performing and choreographing for 40 years." She is often drafted to mentor and coach international dance professionals. Past students include Melba Moore, Brooke Shields, and Irene Cara.

Sue is also proclaimed as one of the most legendary dance teachers of NYC by Backstage magazine.  Praised for the strong, ballet infused technique she instills within her students globally.

In order to give students experience of live performance, she also organises student groups twice annually with fellow dancer and choreographer Kat Wildish.

She has been on the faculty at Broadway Dance Center since 1986 and also teaches at Peridance Capezio Center, both in New York City. She has also taught at The Ailey Extension for many years.

Samuels was commissioned to teach at New York University in the Cap 21 program with theater majors, as well as Olympic instructors in Tokyo, Japan. She has taught at The Broward Civic Ballet, Frank Hatchett’s Professional Children’s Program, Dance Masters Association, and The Dance Company of Haiti.

Selected works and performances

Choreographed works

 Got Tu Go Disco, Minskoff Theatre on Broadway (lead dancer and assistant choreographer)
 5th Dimension Show, Uris Theater, Broadway (lead dancer, assistant choreographer, costume designer)

Television credits

 The Arthritis Telethon with Melba Moore – dancer, choreographer (1973-1974)
 Zoom – CBS – TV Montreal, Dancer (1973-1974)

Commercials

 Arrow Shirts with Joe Namath – lead dancer, assistant choreographer, singer (1971)
 Dr. Pepper – Tony Stevens, Choreographer, Dancer Singer (1979)

See also

 Jazz Roots Dance Company web site

References

1949 births
American female dancers
American jazz dancers
American women choreographers
American choreographers
Living people
21st-century American women